A fixative is used to equalize the vapor pressures, and thus the volatilities, of the raw materials in a perfume oil, as well as to increase the tenacity.

Fixatives can be resinoids (benzoin, labdanum, myrrh, olibanum, storax, tolu balsam) or the molecules ambroxide, civetone and muscone, which were originally obtained from animals, but can and are now mostly synthesized because it is more economical, more consistent and more ethical (animals were either killed or are kept in captivity to collect the secretions from their perineal glands). Synthetic fixatives include substances of low volatility (diphenylmethane, dipropylene glycol (DPG), cyclopentadecanolide, ambroxide, benzyl salicylate) and virtually odorless solvents with very low vapor pressures (benzyl benzoate, diethyl phthalate, triethyl citrate).

References

Perfume ingredients